Laymyethnar is a village in the Wundwin Township, Mandalay Division of central Myanmar.

External links
 Laymyethnar Map

References

Populated places in Mandalay District